On 8 August 2013, a suicide attacker exploded a bomb at a funeral being held for a police officer in Quetta, Pakistan, and killed as many as thirty-one people and injured over fifty people. No group has taken responsibility for the bombing, but it is believed that the Taliban were behind the bombing. A senior police officer, Fayaz Sumbal, noticed the suicide bomber before he blew himself up. As Fayaz began searching the suicide bomber's body, the bomber blew himself up. The bomber was wearing a jacket that had ball bearings and shrapnel inside.

See also
 8 August 2016 Quetta bombing
 Terrorist incidents in Pakistan in 2013

References

2013 murders in Pakistan
21st-century mass murder in Pakistan
Suicide bombings in Pakistan
Terrorist incidents in Pakistan in 2013
Terrorist incidents in Quetta
Mass murder in 2013